Berthelinia darwini is a species of a sea snail with a shell comprising two separate hinged pieces or valves. It is a marine gastropod mollusc in the family Juliidae.

Distribution
This species is found in Darwin, Northern Territory of Australia.
The type locality for this species is harbour in Darwin, Australia, Northern Australia.

References

Juliidae
Gastropods described in 1997